Küsnacht is a municipality in the district of Meilen in the canton of Zurich in Switzerland.

History

Küsnacht is first mentioned in 1188 as de Cussenacho.

Earliest findings of settlement date back to the stone age. There are also findings from the Bronze Age. During Roman times, a mansion was located on the commons. It was called fundus Cossiniacus which is probably the origin of the name of Küsnacht. In the 7th century the name was recorded as Chussenacho. The coat of arms shows a golden cushion on a red background. It is probably a derivate of the coat of arms of the aristocrats of Küssnacht am Rigi.

In the Middle Ages, the land was governed by the House of Regensberg who lived in the castle of Wulp in Küsnacht. After 1531 Küsnacht was governed by Zurich.

Like most other municipalities along Lake Zürich, Küsnacht started to become a suburb of the city of Zürich with the development of the railway link in 1896.

The psychiatrist Carl Jung had his clinic in Küsnacht, which attracted patients from all over the world. Thomas Mann lived in Küsnacht between 1933 and 1939, after he was forced to leave Germany by the Nazis. The most famous resident of the town is Tina Turner.

Geography

Of this area, 34.5% is used for agricultural purposes, while 32.1% is forested. Of the rest of the land, 32.8% is settled (buildings or roads) and the remainder (0.5%) is non-productive (rivers, glaciers or mountains).   housing and buildings made up 25.6% of the total area, while transportation infrastructure made up the rest (7%). Of the total unproductive area, water (streams and lakes) made up 0.4% of the area.   33% of the total municipal area was undergoing some type of construction.

It is located on the north-east bank (also known as Goldküste) of the Lake Zurich in the Pfannenstiel region.  The local dialect is called Züridütsch.

Demographics

, 19.7% of the population was made up of foreign nationals.   the gender distribution of the population was 47.4% male and 52.6% female. Over the last 10 years the population has grown at a rate of 6.6%. Most of the population speaks German  (86.1%), with English being second most common ( 3.6%) and Italian being third ( 2.5%).

In the 2007 election the most popular party was the SVP which received 32.8% of the vote.  The next three most popular parties were the FDP (30.5%), the SPS (12.4%) and the CSP (8.9%).

The age distribution of the population is children and teenagers (0–19 years old) make up 17.7% of the population, while adults (20–64 years old) make up 59.1% and seniors (over 64 years old) make up 23.2%.  In Küsnacht about 84.6% of the population (between age 25-64) have completed either non-mandatory upper secondary education or additional higher education (either university or a Fachhochschule).  There are 5843 households in Küsnacht.

Küsnacht has an unemployment rate of 1.51%.  , there were 167 people employed in the primary economic sector and about 43 businesses involved in this sector.  849 people are employed in the secondary sector and there are 91 businesses in this sector.  3794 people are employed in the tertiary sector, with 664 businesses in this sector.   40% of the working population were employed full-time, and 60% were employed part-time.

 there were 3578 Catholics and 5417 Protestants in Küsnacht. In the 2000 census, religion was broken down into several smaller categories. Of the rest of the population, 2% were Muslim, 4.4% belonged to another religion (not listed), 3.7% did not give a religion, and 15.2% were atheist or agnostic.

The historical population is given in the following table:

Weather
Küsnacht has an average of 136 days of rain per year and on average receives  of precipitation. The wettest month is August during which time Küsnacht receives  of precipitation. During that month, there is precipitation for an average of 12.3 days.

Transport

There are four railway stations within the municipality of Küsnacht. Küsnacht ZH and Küsnacht Goldbach stations are both on the Lake Zürich right-bank line, and are served by S-Bahn Zürich services S6 and S16. Neue Forch and Forch stations are on the inland Forchbahn line, and are served by service S18.

In the summer there are regular boats to Zurich as well as along the lake to Rapperswil, run by the Zürichsee-Schifffahrtsgesellschaft (ZSG).

Sport
The ZSC Lions' affiliates, the GCK Lions, play in the Swiss League (SL). Their home arena is the 2,200-seat Eishalle Küsnacht.

Sites of interest
Apart from Lake Zurich, popular sites to visit include 
 C. G. Jung Institute
 the Cistercian abbey of Kappel am Albis
 Küsnachter Tobel with hiking trails among glacial moraine with rare flora and fauna
 Johanniterkomturei building (today housing the Kantonsschule)
 Oberen Mühle, a mill that now houses the local museum
 Seeclub Küsnacht boathouse dating from at least 1290
 the  dating from the 12th century
 Ruins of Wulp Castle
 Küsnachter Horn, a park close to the lake and the Küsnacht ship stop, run by the Zürichsee-Schifffahrtsgesellschaft (ZSG)

Notable people 

 19th century
 Conrad Ferdinand Meyer (1825–1898) a Swiss poet and historical novelist, (Seehof, Hornweg 28)
 Julius Maggi (1846–1912) a Swiss entrepreneur, inventor of precooked soups and Maggi sauce
 Eugen Sutermeister (1862–1931) a Swiss graveur and writer, founded the Sonos Society
 Paul Sutermeister (1864 in Küsnacht – 1905) a Swiss theologian, pastor and editor 
 Meinrad Lienert (1865-1933) a Swiss writer, poet and journalist
 Otto Frederick Hunziker (1873–1959) Swiss-born American educator and innovator in the dairy industry 
 Thomas Mann (1875–1955) writer, Nobel Prize in Literature 1929, lived in Küsnacht 1933-1939 (Schiedhaldenstrasse 33)
 Carl Jung (1875-1961) psychiatrist and psychoanalyst (Seestrasse 228)
 Albin Zollinger (1895–1941) writer

20th century
 Albert Frey-Wyssling (1900 in Küsnacht – 1988) Swiss botanist, initiated the study of molecular biology
 Bernard von Brentano (1901–1964) a German writer, poet and playwright; lived in Küsnacht 1933-1949  
 Hermann Haller (1914–2002) composer
 Marie-Louise von Franz (1915–1998) Jungian psychologist and scholar
 Tina Turner (born 1939) American-born  singer and entertainer, has lived in Küsnacht since 1994 
 Ursula Biemann (born 1955 in Küsnacht) a Swiss video artist, curator and art theorist
 Rolf Dörig (born 1957) a Swiss entrepreneur, CEOn of the Swiss Life Group and Adecco 
 Daniel Aegerter (born 1969) chairman of Armada Investment Group
 Monisha Kaltenborn (born 1971) the former team principal of the Sauber Formula One team
 Georg C. F. Greve (born 1973) physicist, author and entrepreneur

 Sport
 Severino Minelli (1909 in Küsnacht – 1994) a Swiss footballer, participated in the 1934 and 1938 FIFA World Cup
 Martin Studach (1944 in Küsnacht – 2007) a Swiss rower, competed in the 1964 and 1968 Summer Olympics
 Karl Grob (born 1946 in Küsnacht) a retired football goalkeeper for FC Zürich, 513 club caps
 Ari Sulander (born 1969) a retired Finnish professional ice hockey goaltender
 Hannu Tihinen (born 1976) a retired Finnish football defender
 Kimi Räikkönen (born 1979) a Finnish racing driver in Formula One

References

External links

Official page (German)

 
Cities in Switzerland
Municipalities of the canton of Zürich
Populated places on Lake Zurich